Glenmark may refer to:
 Glenmark (ship), a British clipper ship of the 1860s-70s
 Glenmark Pharmaceuticals, an Indian Pharmaceuticals company
 Glenmark, California, United States
 Glenmark Station, sheep station of George Henry Moore near Waipara, New Zealand
 Glenmark Wines, a New Zealand vintnery
 Glen Mark, Angus, Scotland, United Kingdom